Eliaz may refer to:

Dinimutive form of the Hebrew given name Eliazar
Eliaz Winery, original name of Binyamina Winery, Israel
Orit Eliaz, birth name of Orit Adato, former Israeli military commander and Israel Prison Service Commissioner
Eliaz Gabay, CEO of YVEL, a Jewelry company, Jerusalem
Amir Eliaz, CTO  of MagnaCom, American communications company
, Israeli poet and editor, recipient of the Prime Minister's Prize for Hebrew Literary Works (2006)
Eliaz, Finnish musician; drummer for the band Private Line